A chapalele is a Chilean dumpling made from boiled potatoes and wheat flour. They are especially prevalent among the cuisine of Chiloé.

References

Chilean cuisine
Chiloé Archipelago
Potato dishes
Dumplings